The Burlingame Daily News was a free daily newspaper in Burlingame, California published six days a week with an average daily circulation of 7,000. The newspaper was founded August 9, 2000 by Dave Price (journalist) and Jim Pavelich, who also published the Palo Alto Daily News. Both papers were distributed in large red newspaper racks and in stores, coffee shops, restaurants, schools and major workplaces. The Burlingame Daily News, along with five other Daily News editions, was sold to Knight Ridder in 2005. After McClatchy's acquisition of Knight Ridder in early 2006, all six Daily News editions, including the Burlingame Daily News, were bundled with the San Jose Mercury News and sold to MediaNews Group of Denver, Colorado. The surviving Daily News papers merged on April 7, 2009.

External links
 Official site
 Knight Ridder buys Daily News
 Daily News publishers ride into sunset

Free daily newspapers
Burlingame, California
Defunct newspapers published in California
Daily newspapers published in the San Francisco Bay Area
MediaNews Group publications
Newspapers established in 2000
Publications disestablished in 2009
2000 establishments in California
2009 disestablishments in California